Maripaston was a village in the Bigi Poika resort of the Para District, Suriname. The village was located along the Saramacca River and used to be the main village of the Matawai maroons.

History 
The wood plantation Sonnette was located at the site since at least 1819, and was abandoned after 1832. The village was founded after 1836 by Adensi, a daughter of granman (paramount leader) Kodjo, but the inhabitants were later chased away by the authorities. Noah Adrai resettled the village in 1852. A Moravian church was constructed in the village in 1860 by Johannes King. 

Maripaston developed into the main village of the Matawai and the seat of the granman. In 1898, Lavanti Agubaka, who lived in Boven Saramacca,  was elected as the new granman, and the village lost the status as main village In 1899 plans had been developed to built a tramway from Berlijn to Maripaston, however the line was never constructed.

Maripaston was last mentioned in newspapers in 1951 as a settled place. and has probably been abandoned. There is economical activity at the site, because illegal gold prospectors used to be active. In 2011, the gold concession was awarded to Grassalco who is operating a gold mine in the area.

Maripaston can only be reached by boat and is located half an hour downstream of Kwakoegron.

Notable people
 Johannes King (~1830-1898), missionary and writer.

Gallery

References

Matawai settlements
Populated places in Para District